St. Ignatius Catholic School is school in George Town, Grand Cayman, Cayman Islands, serving preschool/nursery through year 13. St Ignatius is known worldwide for its excellent musical department and the other departments are known as well such as Religious Education, STEM, PE and English.

 there are 300 students from 20 countries in the secondary division (years 7–13).

The school began in September 1971 as Our Lady of Perpetual Help. The high school opened in 1994.

The current Head of School is Emily Alexanders.

References

External links
 

Schools in George Town, Cayman Islands
Secondary schools in the Cayman Islands
1971 establishments in the Cayman Islands
Educational institutions established in 1971
Roman Catholic secondary schools in the Caribbean
Catholic Church in the Cayman Islands